The Transcendental Model 1-G was an experimental American tiltrotor prototype of the 1950s. It was a single-seat aircraft powered by a single piston engine, and was the first tiltrotor to fly. A single example was built, which was destroyed in a crash in 1955.

Transcendental Flight Test Videos 
The following video comes from the personal library of William E. Cobey Jr., President of Transcendental Aircraft, 1952 to 1958.

Design and development
The Transcendental Aircraft Company was founded in January 1947 at New Castle, Delaware by Mario Guerrieri and Bob Lichten, two employees of Kellet Aircraft, to develop the Model 1-G, on which they had begun design work in 1945. Their design was a small cantilever monoplane powered by a single  Lycoming O-290-A air-cooled flat-four engine positioned in the fuselage that drove two 3-blade rotors at the tips of the wings via a two-speed reduction gearbox. Two  electric motors were used to tilt the rotors, with the rotors linked by a shaft running through the wing to ensure that both rotors would be tilted at the same angle. A steel tube forward fuselage carried the single pilot, engine and gearbox, with the open cockpit positioned forward of the engine and gearbox. An aluminum alloy monocoque tail boom carried the aircraft's tail surfaces. A fixed tricycle landing gear was fitted.

The aircraft's rotors were controlled with cyclic and collective controls as used by a helicopter, for use in helicopter mode, while conventional ailerons, elevators and a rudder were fitted to the aircraft's wings and tail to control the aircraft in airplane mode.

Development was slow owing to a shortage of funds, with the prototype sufficiently complete to allow testing on a ground test rig in 1951, although it was badly damaged later that year when the rotors disintegrated on the test bed during the first run at full revolutions. A series of contracts from the United States Air Force (USAF) allowed development to continue, and for the Model 1-G to be rebuilt into a form suitable for flight testing.

Lichten left Transcendental in 1948, and, in September 1952, Guerrieri sold his interests in the company to William E. Cobey Jr., a Kellett Aircraft Corporation vibrations expert who continued the development of the Model 1-G. With some funding provided by a 1952 Army/Air Force contract for flight data reports and analyses, hover testing of the 1750 lb. Model 1-G began on June 15, 1954.

Operational history
The Model 1-G, registered N2704A made its first tethered flight at Bellanca Airfield New Castle on June 15, 1954, following this by the first untethered free flight on July 6. On July 20, 1955, N2704A suffered a control system failure causing it to crash into the Delaware River. Although the pilot escaped with only minor injuries, the aircraft was wrecked.

By the time of its loss, the Model 1-G had carried out over 100 flights, accumulating 23 flight hours. Although it never made a complete transition to and from wing-borne flight, tilt angles of 75 degrees were reached during testing, with more than 90% of lift generated by the aircraft's wings. Transcendental received a further contract from the USAF in 1956, which allowed it to design and build a new tiltrotor, the more powerful and aerodynamically refined Transcendental Model 2, which flew late in 1956. US Government funds were then directed to the Bell XV-3, however, causing the Model 2 to be abandoned with Transcendental being sold to Republic Aviation.

Specifications (performance estimated)

Notes

References

External links
 Transcendental Model 1G. vstol.org
 Transcendental. helis.com
 photo

Tiltrotor aircraft
1950s United States experimental aircraft
1-G
High-wing aircraft
Single-engined twin-prop tractor aircraft
Aircraft first flown in 1954